Copeland is an unincorporated community in Boundary County, Idaho, United States.  Copeland lies on Idaho State Highway 1 north of its intersection with U.S. Route 95.  Copeland is northwest of Bonners Ferry and close to the Idaho-British Columbia border.

The Pacific Northwest National Scenic Trail comes through Copeland on its 1,200 mile journey from the Continental Divide to the Pacific Ocean.

History
Copeland's population was 25 in 1960.

References

Unincorporated communities in Boundary County, Idaho
Unincorporated communities in Idaho